New Synagogue was the largest synagogue in Tarnów, Poland. It was built from 1865 to 1908, with the long period of construction due to lack of funds. The synagogue was set on fire by the Nazis in November 1939. The fire lasted three days but the building did not collapse; it was blown up instead.

References

Former synagogues in Poland
Synagogues destroyed by Nazi Germany
Buildings and structures in Tarnów
Holocaust locations in Poland